The Chinese Consul General to Liechtenstein is the official representative of the People's Republic of China to Liechtenstein.

List of representatives

See also

References 

Liechtenstein
China